Saba Anjum (born 12 June 1985) is a former member of the Indian women's hockey team. She was the youngest of all participants in hockey competition at the 2002 Commonwealth Games in Manchester.

She first played for India in under-18 AHF Cup in 2000. As a right wing forward, she has represented India in many other international tournaments like Asian Games Oct 2002, Asia Cup Feb 2004 Delhi, Commonwealth Games 2002 and 2006, Manchester, Junior World Cup May 2001, Buenos Aires and Australian Test Series and New Zealand Tour.

She hails from Kelabadi, Durg.
On 1 November, she was honored with Chhattisgarh's top Gundadhur sports award. The annual award is given to a person who brings honor to state in the field of sports at national and international level. The award is rewarded along with cash prize of Rs 1 Lakh and a citation.
Govt of Chhattisgarh has honoured her by giving posting in police department at the post of Deputy Superintendent of Police (DSP). @ Chhattisgarh Durg
For year 2013, she is honored with Arjuna award by the president of India.

She was awarded Padma Shri, the fourth highest civilian award of India, in 2015.

References

External links
Biography
Commonwealth Games Biography

Living people
1985 births
Indian female field hockey players
Field hockey players at the 2002 Commonwealth Games
Field hockey players at the 2006 Commonwealth Games
Field hockey players at the 2010 Commonwealth Games
Commonwealth Games gold medallists for India
Commonwealth Games silver medallists for India
Sportswomen from Chhattisgarh
Asian Games medalists in field hockey
Field hockey players at the 2002 Asian Games
Field hockey players at the 2006 Asian Games
Field hockey players at the 2010 Asian Games
Field hockey players from Bhopal
People from Durg
Asian Games bronze medalists for India
Commonwealth Games medallists in field hockey
Recipients of the Padma Shri in sports
21st-century Indian women
21st-century Indian people
Medalists at the 2006 Asian Games
Field hockey players from Chhattisgarh
Recipients of the Arjuna Award
Medallists at the 2002 Commonwealth Games
Medallists at the 2006 Commonwealth Games